Ruth Cohen  ( – August 23, 2008) was an American character actress.

Biography
Cohen was born in the New York City borough of the Bronx, and began acting in the 1980s after being widowed. She played the background role of cashier in Monk's Café on Seinfeld, appearing in 101 of the show's 180 episodes, more than anyone other than the four main characters. She had brief speaking roles in three episodes: "The Gum," "The Foundation," and "The Junk Mail."

She also appeared in other sitcoms such as The Golden Girls, Married... with Children, and Roseanne.

Cohen died of a heart attack on August 23, 2008, aged 78, in the Panorama City neighborhood of Los Angeles. Her memorial service and burial were held at the Mount Sinai Memorial Park Cemetery in Hollywood Hills.

References

External links
 

1930 births
2008 deaths
Actresses from New York City
American television actresses
People from the Bronx
People from Greater Los Angeles
Burials at Mount Sinai Memorial Park Cemetery
20th-century American actresses
21st-century American actresses